Parma microlepis, commonly known as the white-ear, is a species of fish in the family Pomacentridae. This fish is endemic to Eastern Australia.

Description
This species grows to ~20 cm. The White-ear changes colour as it grows but always has a white mark on its 'ear'. Young juveniles are brightly coloured but as the fish grows the colours fade to the adult colouration of yellowish-brown to grey or black".

Distribution
The white-ear is endemic to Australia, occurring from northern New South Wales to northern Tasmania.

Behaviour
During the breeding season, aggressive males may bite divers.

Habitat
Parma microlepis are benthic coastal reef inhabitants and are commonly found on reef, in depths of 1–55 m.

Diet

Omnivorous.

References

microlepis
Fish described in 1862
Taxa named by Albert Günther